W. Woodrow "Woodie" Wilson (October 8, 1925 – September 13, 1994) was an American stock car racing driver. One of the pioneers of NASCAR, he competed in the Grand National Division. There is little known of his life, even during his racing career.

References

External links

1925 births
1994 deaths
Sportspeople from Mobile, Alabama
Racing drivers from Alabama
NASCAR drivers